The Philippines competed at the 2004 Summer Paralympics in Athens, Greece. The team had two Powerlifting athletes, one man and one woman, neither of whom won a medal. Previous to this edition of the Paralympics, the Philippines likewise failed to win an Olympic medal in Athens yet again.

Powerlifting 

Men

Women

See also
Philippines at the Paralympics
Philippines at the 2004 Summer Olympics

References 

Nations at the 2004 Summer Paralympics
2004
Summer Paralympics